Technosphere(s) may refer to:

Technosphere, another name for anthroposphere, that part of the environment which is made or modified by humans
TechnoSphere, an online digital environment
Technosphere, an ecological term in reference to novel human technoecosystems; see Novel ecosystem